Syed Shahnawaz Hussain is an Indian politician and a member of the Central Election Committee of Bharatiya Janata Party. He is one of the national spokespersons of Bharatiya Janata Party (BJP). Hussain was the  Minister of Textiles and the Minister Civil Aviation in the Atal Bihari Vajpayee government. He has been the Minister of Industries of the Government of Bihar since 9 February 2021 To 9 August 2022.

Personal life 
Hussain was born on 12 December 1968 to Syed Nasir Hussain and Nasima Khatoon in Supaul, Bihar. He has a Diploma in Engineering (Electronics) from B.S.S.E., Supaul and ITI, Pusa, Delhi. He married Renu Sharma on 12 December 1994, with whom he has two sons.

Political career 
Hussain was elected to the 13th Lok Sabha in 1999 from Kishanganj constituency. He was appointed as a Minister of State in the Third Vajpayee ministry and held various portfolios such as food processing industries, youth affairs and sports and human resource development at different times. He was given independent charge of the Ministry of Coal in 2001 and was elevated to the rank of a Cabinet Minister with Civil Aviation portfolio in September 2001, thereby becoming the youngest Cabinet Minister ever in the Government of India. Later he held the Textiles portfolio as Cabinet Minister from 2003 to 2004. He is often referred to as 'The Original Youth leader'.

Though he lost the 2004 general elections, he re-entered the Lok Sabha in November 2006 in a by-election when he won the vacant seat of Bhagalpur constituency in Bihar. He entered the 15th Lok Sabha again from Bhagalpur in 2009. He contested the Lok Sabha election in 2014 from Bhagalpur again but lost with a small margin. He helped Bhagalpur to be named under Prime Minister Narendra Modi's Smart Cities Scheme. Due to his efforts, Dibrugarh Rajdhani Express got a halt at Naughachia Railway station.

On 21 January 2021, Hussain was elected unopposed to Bihar Legislative Council. On 9 February 2021, He was inducted as a cabinet minister in the Seventh Nitish Kumar ministry. He was the Minister of Industries of the Government of Bihar.

References

External links

1968 births
Living people
Bharatiya Janata Party politicians from Bihar
Indian Muslims
Lok Sabha members from Bihar
People from Supaul district
India MPs 1999–2004
India MPs 2004–2009
India MPs 2009–2014
People from Kishanganj district
People from Samastipur district
National Democratic Alliance candidates in the 2014 Indian general election
Civil aviation ministers of India
People from Bhagalpur district
Politicians from Patna
Members of the Bihar Legislative Council